Charissa is a genus of moths in the family Geometridae.

Species

 Charissa adjectaria Staudinger, 1897
 Charissa ambiguata (Duponchel, 1830)
 Charissa annubilata Christoph, 1885
 Charissa anthina Wehrli, 1953
 Charissa asymmetra Wehrli, 1939
 Charissa avilarius (Reisser, 1936)
 Charissa bellieri (Oberthür, 1913)
 Charissa bidentatus (Stshetkin & Viidalepp, 1980)
 Charissa bundeli (Stshetkin & Viidalepp, 1980)
 Charissa canariensis
 Charissa certhiatus (Rebel & Zerny, 1931)
 Charissa ciscaucasica Rjabov, 1964
 Charissa corsica (Oberthür, 1913)
 Charissa crenulata (Staudinger, 1871)
 Charissa difficilis (Alphéraky, 1883)
 Charissa difficillimus Wiltshire, 1967
 Charissa dubitaria (Staudinger, 1892)
 Charissa effendii (Viidalepp & Pirijev, 1993)
 Charissa exilis Wehrli, 1922
 Charissa exsuctaria Püngeler, 1903
 Charissa glaciatus Wehrli, 1922
 Charissa glaucinaria (Hübner, [1799])
 Charissa hissariensis (Stshetkin & Viidalepp, 1980)
 Charissa intermedia (Wehrli, 1917)
 Charissa italohelveticus (Rezbanyai-Reser, 1986)
 Charissa longipes (Viidalepp, 1980)
 Charissa luticiliata Christoph, 1887
 Charissa maracandica (Viidalepp, 1992)
 Charissa mcguffini (Smiles, 1980)
 Charissa mucidaria (Hübner, 1799)
 Charissa mutilata (Staudinger, 1879)
 Charissa obscurata – annulet (Denis & Schiffermüller, 1775)
 Charissa onustaria (Herrich-Schäffer, [1852])
 Charissa pallescens (Rjabov, 1964)
 Charissa pentheri (Rebel, 1904)
 Charissa pollinaria Christoph, 1887
 Charissa praeacutaria (Wehrli, 1922)
 Charissa predotae (Schawerda, 1929)
 Charissa pullata (Denis & Schiffermüller, 1775)
 Charissa remmi (Viidalepp, 1988)
 Charissa rjabovi Wehrli, 1939
 Charissa sheljuzhkoi (Schawerda, 1924)
 Charissa sibiriata (Guenée, 1857)
 Charissa subsplendidaria Wehrli, 1922
 Charissa supinaria (Mann, 1854)
 Charissa symmicta Wehrli, 1953
 Charissa talvei (Viidalepp, 1980)
 Charissa talyshensis (Wehrli, 1936)
 Charissa turfosaria Wehrli, 1922
 Charissa urmensis Wehrli, 1953
 Charissa uzbekistanica (Viidalepp, 1988)
 Charissa variegata (Duponchel, 1830)
 Charissa zaprjagaevi (Viidalepp, 1980)
 Charissa zeitunaria (Staudinger, 1901)
 Charissa zejae Wehrli, 1953

References
 Charissa at Markku Savela's Lepidoptera and Some Other Life Forms
 Natural History Museum Lepidoptera genus database

External links
 

Gnophini
Moth genera
Taxa named by John Curtis